is a Japanese pop singer. She is the daughter of musicians Ryuichi Sakamoto and Akiko Yano.

Biography

Sakamoto provided a cover of "Miu" for the January 29, 2020 Buck-Tick tribute album Parade III ~Respective Tracks of Buck-Tick~

Discography

Albums 
 DAWN PINK (September 29, 1999)
 Harmonious (May 24, 2006)
 Oboro no Kanata, Akari no Kehai (December 12, 2007) – (Produced by SUGIZO)
 Zoy (November 5, 2008)
 PHANTOM Girl (May 19, 2010) (Produced by The Shanghai Restoration Project) 
 HATSUKOI (May 18, 2011) (SRP)
 I'm yours! (August 8, 2012) (SRP)
 Waving Flags (March 5, 2014)
 Sing with me II (with Cantus) (December 7, 2016)

Mini-Albums 
 aquascape (November 26, 1998)
 sorato (Masakatsu Takagi x Sakamoto Miu) (October 10, 2007)
 iTunes Live from Tokyo (January 23, 2008)
 Sing with me (with Cantus) (June 22, 2016)

Best albums 
 miusic ~The best of 1997–2012~ (June 26, 2013)

Live albums 
 LIVE Waving Flags (March 18, 2015)

Singles 
 "Poppoya" (May 26, 1999) – composed and arranged by Ryuichi Sakamoto, with lyrics by Tamio Okuda
 "in aquascape" (September 8, 1999) – written by Miu Sakamoto, composed and arranged by Ryuichi Sakamoto
 "I'll believe the look in your eyes" (February 9, 2000) – written by Miu Sakamoto, composed by Yuka Kawamura, and arranged by Ryuichi Sakamoto
 "beautiful" (July 26, 2000) – written by Miu Sakamoto, composed and arranged by Yuka Honda
 "Blank" (April 11, 2001) – written by Miu Sakamoto, composed and arranged by Toru Okada
 "15fun" (May 23, 2001) – written by Miu Sakamoto, composed and arranged by Noriyuki Makihara
 "Kaze Hikaru" (October 24, 2001) – written by Miu Sakamoto, composed and arranged by Kenji Kawai
 "sleep away" (April 24, 2002) – written by Miu Sakamoto, composed and arranged by SUGIZO
 "Kumanbachi ga tonde kita" (November 20, 2002) – written by Shigesato Itoi and composed by Akiko Yano
 "The NeverEnding Story" (November 16, 2005) – composed by Giorgio Moroder, with lyrics by Keith Forsey

Digital Singles 
 [2005.09.12] Never Ending Story (CM Version)
 [2010.04.14] Phantom Girl's First Love
 [2010.05.19] Phantom Girl's First Love -Classical Remix-
 [2010.11.24] Hajimari Hajimari (はじまりはじまり; Beginning Beginning)
 [2011.05.18] Precious
 [2012.07.04] Anata to Watashi no Aida ni Aru Mono Subete Ai to Yobu (あなたと私の間にあるもの全て愛と呼ぶ)
 [2012.09.12] I'm yours (Taan Newjam Remix)

Participation in Vocaloid 
Miu Sakamoto is the voice provider for Yamaha's Vocaloid Mew. Mew was a starter Vocaloid released alongside the Vocaloid 3 software, with VY1V3.

Mew's first single, "Line", debuted in The Vocaloid, an album produced by Yamaha.

References

External links 
 Official blog 
 Official website 
 Miu Sakamoto at Warner Music Japan 

1980 births
Living people
21st-century Japanese singers
Vocaloid voice providers
21st-century Japanese women singers
Japanese women pop singers